Mushaboom may refer to:

"Mushaboom" (song), a 2004 song by Feist
Mushaboom, Nova Scotia, a community in Canada